Reillanne is a commune in the Alpes-de-Haute-Provence department in southeastern France.

It is due north of Toulon and west of Nice.

History
The earliest record of a city on this site is the Roman town of Alaunia in 909.  That city was at the bottom of the hill, but was destroyed by invading barbarians in the 10th century.  The residents moved the city to the top of the hill and built a castle for defense.  The castle was destroyed during the Wars of Religion but the city itself survived.

Population

Twin towns
Reillanne is twinned with:
  Roccasparvera, Italy (1996)

See also
 Luberon
Communes of the Alpes-de-Haute-Provence department

References

External links

Tourism office

Communes of Alpes-de-Haute-Provence
Alpes-de-Haute-Provence communes articles needing translation from French Wikipedia